Tobias Peterka (born 4 September 1982) is a German politician for the populist Alternative for Germany (AfD) and since 2017 member of the Bundestag, the German federal diet.

Life and achievements

Peterka was born 1982 in the west German town of Achern and studied jurisprudence at the University of Bayreuth

In 2013 he entered the newly founded AfD and became member of the Bundestag in 2017

References

Living people
1982 births
Members of the Bundestag for Bavaria
People from Achern
University of Bayreuth alumni
Members of the Bundestag 2017–2021
Members of the Bundestag 2021–2025
Members of the Bundestag for the Alternative for Germany